Roller sports at the 2011 Southeast Asian Games was held in Palembang, Indonesia. A total of 12 events were held at Jakabaring Sport City.

Medal summary

Men

Women

Medal table

2011 Southeast Asian Games events
2011 Southeast Asian Games
2011 in roller sports